Andrej Medved (born 3 February 1947) is a Slovene poet, editor and translator. He has published numerous poetry collections.

Medved was born in Ljubljana in 1947. He studied philosophy and history of art at the University of Ljubljana and worked as an editor at various publications including the Le Livre Slovène, the predecessor of the current Litterae slovenicae, published by the Slovene Writers' Association. He currently works as a curator at the Coastal Galleries in Piran and is editor of the Artes and Hyperion series.

He won the Prešeren Foundation Award in 2003 for his poetry collection Hiperion, the Jenko Award in 2008 for his poetry collection Približevanja (Convergences) and the Veronika Award in 2010 for Razlagalec sanj (Interpreter of Dreams).

Poetry collections

 Vrtovi Prispodob, žalobni lokvanji užitkov (Gardens of Metaphors, Gloomy Water Lilies of Pleasures), 2011
 Približevanja (Convergences), 2008
 Svetloba, v labirintu, 2007
 Vmesnost, 2007
 Ekloge, 2007
 Medprostor: allegro ma non troppo, 2007
 Priprtja & odstiranja, 2006
 Rimske elegije, 2004
 Nevarna razmerja, 2004
 Kitara, 2004
 Terpsihora, 2003
 Labirinti, 2003
 Hiperion, 2002
 Pesmi, 2001
 Uroki in prerokbe, 2001
 Kilini, 1996
 Videnja, 1994
 Telo losa, 1992
 Glava, 1987
 Ogenj, ogenj pada, 1974
 Sled, 1971
 Po poti vrnitve, po poti bega, 1969
 Toujours de nouveau (Vedno znova), 1966

References

Slovenian poets
Slovenian male poets
Slovenian editors
Slovenian translators
Living people
1947 births
Writers from Ljubljana
Veronika Award laureates
University of Ljubljana alumni